The marginal propensity to import (MPM) is the fractional change in import expenditure that occurs with a change in disposable income (income after taxes and transfers).  For example, if a household earns one extra dollar of disposable income, and the marginal propensity to import is 0.2, then the household will spend 20 cents of that dollar on imported goods and services.

Mathematically, the marginal propensity to import (MPM) function is expressed as the derivative of the import (M) function with respect to disposable income (Y).In other words, the marginal propensity to import is measured as the ratio of the change in imports to the change in income, thus giving us a figure between 0 and 1.  

Imports are also considered to be automatic stabilisers that work to lessen fluctuations in real GDP.

The UK government assumes that UK citizens have a high marginal propensity to import and thus will use a decrease in disposable income as a tool to control the current account on the balance of payments.

See also
Marginal propensity to save
Marginal propensity to consume
Automatic stabiliser
Multiplier model

International trade theory
Marginal concepts
Import